A big-box store (also hyperstore, supercenter, superstore, or megastore) is a physically large retail establishment, usually part of a chain of stores. The term sometimes also refers, by extension, to the company that operates the store. The term "big-box" references the typical appearance of buildings occupied by such stores.

Commercially, big-box stores can be broken down into two categories: general merchandise (examples include Walmart, Target, and Kmart), and specialty stores (such as The Home Depot, Barnes & Noble, or Best Buy), which specialize in goods within a specific range, such as hardware, books, or consumer electronics, respectively. In the late 20th and early 21st centuries, many traditional retailers and supermarket chains that typically operate in smaller buildings, such as Tesco and Praktiker, opened stores in the big-box-store format in an effort to compete with big-box chains, which are expanding internationally as their home markets reach maturity.

The store may sell general dry goods, in which case it is a general merchandise retailer (however, traditional department stores, as the predecessor format, are generally not classified as "big box"), or may be limited to a particular specialty (such establishments are often called "category killers"), or may also sell groceries, in which case some countries (mostly in Europe) use the term hypermarket. In the U.S., there is no specific term for general merchandisers who also sell groceries. Both Target and Walmart offer groceries in most branches in the U.S.

Big-box stores are often clustered in shopping centers, which are typically called retail parks in the United Kingdom.

Big-box stores in various countries

Australia

In 1969, Kmart Australia opened its first 5 Big-box type stores across Australia. The first opened in Burwood East, Melbourne in April, followed by Blacktown in Greater Western Sydney, 2 stores in suburban Adelaide and a store in suburban Perth. IKEA began operation in Australia in 1975. Bunnings Warehouse followed in 1995 and Mitre 10 Australia adopted the model with the "Mitre 10 Mega" stores first opening at Beenleigh, Queensland in 2004. Costco has since expanded across Australia since opening its first store in 2009.

Canada
Apart from major American big-box stores such as Walmart Canada and briefly now-defunct Target Canada, there are many retail chains operating exclusively in Canada.  These include stores such as (followed after each slash by the owner) Hudson's Bay/Home Outfitters, Loblaws/Real Canadian Superstore, Rona, Winners/HomeSense, Canadian Tire/Mark's/Sport Chek, Shoppers Drug Mart, Chapters/Indigo Books and Music, Sobeys, and many others. The indigenous Loblaw Companies Limited has expanded and multiplied its Real Canadian Superstore (and Maxi & Cie in Quebec) branded outlets to try to fill any genuine big-box market and fend off the damaging competition that a large Walmart penetration would inflict on Canadian-based retailers.

In the early 21st century, commercial developers in Canada such as RioCan chose to build big-box stores (often grouped together in so-called "power centres") in lieu of traditional shopping malls. Examples include Deerfoot Meadows (Calgary), Stonegate Shopping Centre and Preston Crossing (Saskatoon), South Edmonton Common (Edmonton), and Heartland Town Centre (Mississauga).

There are currently more than 300 power centers, which usually contain multiple big-box stores, located throughout Canada.

China
Most large grocery stores in China are of the big-box variety, selling big screen TVs, computers, mobile phones, bicycles, and clothing. Many foreign names appear, such as Carrefour, Auchan, Tesco, Lotte Mart, and Walmart, as well as dozens of Chinese chains. Most stores are three stories with moving sidewalk-style escalators. Some stores are so large as to have 60 checkout terminals and their own fleet of buses to bring customers to the store at no charge.

France

Many configurations exist: the hypermarket that sells many kinds of goods under one roof (like French chains Carrefour, Auchan, and E.Leclerc), most of which are integrated within a shopping mall; the supermarket that is a smaller version of a hypermarket; the market located in city centres; the department store, which first appeared in Paris, then opened in other parts of the world; the "category killer" superstore that mainly sells goods in a particular domain (automotive, electronics, home furniture, etc.); and the warehouse store, like Metro Cash and Carry (for professionals only) and Costco, who opened its first store in June, 2017.

Hong Kong 

To contend against Carrefour, PARKnSHOP opened the first superstore in 1996 based on the concept of a wet market. Most superstores in Hong Kong emphasizes one-stop shopping, such as providing car park services. Today, PARKnSHOP has more than 50 superstores and megastores, making it the largest superstore network in Hong Kong. The first Wellcome superstore opened in 2000 and it has only 17 superstores. In addition, CRC has four superstores in Hong Kong.

Because Hong Kong is a very densely populated city, the sizes of superstores are considerably smaller than those in other countries. Some superstores are running at deficit, such as Chelsea Heights which therefore has stopped selling fresh fish. Furthermore, some PARKnSHOP superstores and megastores, such as Fortress World, belong to the same corporation, Hutchison Whampoa.

India

India has been going through a retail revolution since the late 1990s, following the introduction of Big Bazaar in 2001. However, even before that, large retail stores were not uncommon in India. Spencer's, a popular hypermart, traces its history as far back as 1863. Likewise Saravana Stores operating as a large independent showroom format since 1969, continue to grow in a mammoth manner. Saravana Stores operating format is said to be the inspiration for Big Bazaar's Kishore Biyani.

Similarly, conglomerates, such as Raheja's, Future Group, Bharti, Godrej, Reliance, and TATA, have over the last decade ventured into large-format retail chains. However, most of the stores opened in large malls and not as independent big-box format stores, even though small and medium enterprises (SMEs) still account for the majority of the daily consumer transaction needs. However, the most successful consumer retail chain that took the market and penetrated also to tier 2 and tier 3 cities was D Mart, owned by Avenue Supermarkets Limited.

An attempt was made to allow international large format retailers such as Walmart into the country. However, it was successfully opposed by small retailers citing job elimination due to increased efficiency and lowered prices due to fewer losses and lower costs.
 
Big-box format stores in India were opened by IKEA in the city of Hyderabad, and subsequently, in the city of Navi Mumbai.

Republic of Ireland

In Ireland, large merchandise stores in the style of U.S. superstores were not a part of the retail sector until the late 20th century. Dunnes Stores have traditionally had a supermarket-plus-household-and-clothes model and now have some large stores. Tesco Ireland now runs upwards of 19 hypermarkets across the country.

New Zealand

The big-box phenomenon hit New Zealand in the late 1980s, with the introduction of Kmart Australia and later the "Warehouse" superstore, a local company. Mitre 10 New Zealand opened their first Mega in 2004 at Hastings, New Zealand six months before the Australian Mega store; it opened to great success with 20 more stores opening within two years. Australian-owned Bunnings Warehouse opened its first store in New Zealand in 2006.

United Kingdom

In the United Kingdom, Makro and Costco membership-only warehouse club stores have been around for 4 decades. General merchandise shops along the lines of U.S. superstores are not a large part of the retail sector, but this has been changing in recent years, with the creation of extra-large supermarkets such as Tesco and Asda selling a broader range of non-food goods, typically in out-of-town shopping centres or retail parks. As in the US, such large shops are sometimes called anchor tenants. The growth of online retail and budget retail has led to these chains moving away from the large out-of-town supermarkets which have waned in popularity.

The term "big-box store" is not used in the UK. "Superstore" is sometimes used, but with a slightly different meaning: on road signs it means "large supermarket"; in self-service shop names it denotes an outlet larger than that particular chain's usual size.

United States

In the United States, some big-box stores may specialize in categories of merchandise ("category killer"), such as Best Buy in electronics and appliances and Kohl's, Burlington, and Nordstrom Rack in apparel and home furnishings.

Big-box general merchandise retailers such as Target and Walmart are similar to the global concept of a hypermarket, although they do not always have a grocery section, and the term "hypermarket" is not in common use in the United States. "Discount store," "megastore," and "superstore" are sometimes used in addition to the industry term "general merchandise retailer." The category began in 1962, when  Walmart, Kmart, Meijer, Target (the discount brand of Dayton department store), and Woolco (the discount brand of the Woolworth department store) all opened. These were called "discount stores" — still an industry term for this type of store — and which between the 1960s and 1980s started to open larger-format stores called "megastores." These stores served the newly enlarged population of customers with cars, being located in suburbs and surrounded by ample parking lots. They were enabled by the decline of laws which prevented large retailers from getting bulk discounts. 

Warehouse club stores are another category of big-box general merchandise stores, such as Sam's Club, Costco, and BJ's Wholesale Club. They require membership to purchase and often require purchasing larger quantities of goods at once.

Typical architectural characteristics 

 Large, free-standing, shoebox, generally single-floor structure built on a concrete slab. The flat roof and ceiling trusses are generally made of steel, and the walls are concrete block clad in metal or masonry siding.
 The structure typically sits in the middle of a large, paved parking lot. The exterior is designed primarily for access by motor vehicles, rather than by pedestrians.
 Floor space several times greater than traditional retailers in the sector, providing for a large amount of merchandise; in North America, generally more than 50,000 square feet (4,650 m2), sometimes approaching 200,000 square feet (18,600 m2), though varying by sector and market. In countries where rentable space is at a premium, such as the United Kingdom, the relevant numbers are smaller and stores are more likely to have two or more floors.

Criticism

Labor
Big-box development has at times been opposed by labor unions because the employees of such stores are usually not unionized. Unions such as the United Food and Commercial Workers Local 770 and the Joint Labor Management Committee of the Retail Food Industry have expressed concern about the grocery market because stores such as Kmart, Target, and Walmart now sell groceries. Unions and cities are attempting to use land-use ordinances to restrict these businesses.

Urban planning

Because it is generally inaccessible to pedestrians and often can only be reached by motor vehicles, the big-box store has been criticized as unsustainable and a failure of urban planning.

See also 

 List of superstores
 List of hypermarkets
 Supplier convergence
 Types of retail outlets

References

External links
 Howard, Theresa, "Big-box stores squeeze into Big Apple," USA Today, October 18, 2004
"Big box retailers versus boutique shops" by TV3 (New Zealand)
 Business Essentials: "Big-Box Retailers" by Adam Hayes at Investopedia, 25 September 2021

Big Box Sprawl PDF from the National Trust for Historic Preservation
 bigboxreuse.com Re-use of big box store buildings

 
Retail buildings